George A. Ricaurte  is a neurologist and researcher who works at the Johns Hopkins School of Medicine in the Department of Neurology.

Biography
Ricaurte received his MD from Northwestern University Medical School and his Ph.D. (Pharmacology) from the University of Chicago.

His clinical work and research focuses on Parkinson's disease and other movement disorders. His work centers on amphetamine-type drugs and their potential to damage monoamine neurons in the brain. Ricaurte is best known for investigating how methamphetamine damages dopamine neurons, and whether MDMA (ecstasy) damages serotonin neurons. The long-term goal of this neurotoxicology research is to help find ways to prevent or retard the progression of Parkinson's disease and related neurodegenerative disorders. His work also has implications for substance use.disorders.

Ricaurte's retracted article on the neurotoxicity of ecstasy, originally published in Science, received attention after its findings suggested that a single nights use of MDMA could cause dopamine dysfunction. These results were considered surprising, as MDMA primarily increases the activity of serotonin. Ricuarte was unable to reproduce the results of the study, and consequently discovered that methamphetamine had accidentally been used instead of MDMA during the original research. The paper was retracted in 2003.

At the time of the original studies‘ release, the organisation MAPS was seeking approval for the use of MDMA to conduct research on psychedelic assisted psychotherapy. The alarming nature of the studies’ results may have created a ‘speed bump’ for the approval process. Following the retraction, MAPS founder and director Rick Doblin called for a re-evaluation of all of Ricuarte’s work, due to his belief that the study was politically motivated. Whilst Ricuarte was still concerned of the dangers of MDMA, he stated in reference to MAPS research- "If subjects are fully informed of these risks and still chose to participate, and if the protocol has been deemed scientifically and ethically acceptable by the appropriate regulatory bodies, then it should be held to the same standards as other clinical research projects."

References

External links
Official Curriculum Vitae (PDF)
Critical account of research on MDMA  - includes reference to Ricaurte's work
Johns Hopkins profile
Multidisciplinary Association for Psychedelic Studies - archive of critical articles about Ricaurte's retracted research.

American neurologists
Living people
American pharmacologists
Year of birth missing (living people)
Place of birth missing (living people)
Feinberg School of Medicine alumni
University of Chicago alumni
Johns Hopkins University faculty